Fundamentalisti (näytelmä) is a Finnish play. It was written by Juha Jokela and produced in 2006.

Finnish plays
2006 plays